The 1962 United States Senate election in California was held on November 6, 1962. 

Incumbent Republican Thomas Kuchel was re-elected to  a second full term in office, defeating Democratic State Senator Richard Richards.

Republican primary

Candidates 
Thomas Kuchel, incumbent Senator since 1954
Howard Jarvis, anti-tax activist
William H. Reinholz
Loyd Wright

Results

Democratic primary

Candidates 
J.F. Coleman
Gabriel Green, photographer and UFO conspiracy theorist
Richard Richards, State Senator from Los Angeles County

Results

General election

Campaign
Write-in campaigns were launched for anti-tax activist Howard Jarvis, 1962 Nobel Peace Prize recipient and proponent of nuclear disarmament Linus Pauling, and Edward Brothers, but none made a significant impact on the race.

Results

References

1962
California
United States Senate